Olivier Eggimann (28 January 1919 – 6 April 2002) was a Swiss football midfielder who played for Switzerland in the 1950 and 1954 FIFA World Cup. He also played for BSC Young Boys, FC Lausanne-Sport, Servette FC, ES FC Malley, and FC La Chaux-de-Fonds.

References

External links
FIFA profile

 

1921 births
2002 deaths
Swiss men's footballers
Switzerland international footballers
Association football midfielders
BSC Young Boys players
FC Lausanne-Sport players
Servette FC players
FC La Chaux-de-Fonds players
1950 FIFA World Cup players
1954 FIFA World Cup players
Swiss Super League players